Girindramohini Dasi (1858 - 1924) was an Indian poet of Bengali origin, best known for her poetry collections Abhas (1890), Flame (1898), and Arghya (1902); and dramas Sannyasini and Mirabai (1892), and Sindhugatha (1906).

References 

1858 births
1924 deaths
Indian writers
Indian women writers
Bengali poets
Women writers from West Bengal